Pabba Ram Bishnoi (Born 24 March 1951) is an Indian politician from Rajasthan.He is presently a MLA from Phalodi.

Political career

Pabba Ram won the election (14th Vidhan Sabha) in December 2013 from Phalodi constituency, as a candidate of Bharatiya Janta Party In the Vidhan Sabha, he is a member of Committee, Estimates "A" (2016–17).

References

External links
 
 https://twitter.com/BishnoiPabbaram Twitter 

Rajasthani politicians
1951 births
Living people